José Augusto Sánchez Pérez (Madrid, 30 November 1882 – 13 November 1958) was a Spanish mathematician and member of the Spanish Royal Academy of Sciences.

He was professor of mathematics at the Instituto Beatriz de Galindo in Madrid. He published in the history of mathematics, in particular on Islamic mathematics in al-Andalus.

References 
 Ausejo Martínez, Elena. "José Augusto Sánceh Pérez" en Actas del IV Simposio Ciencia y Técnica en España de 1898 1 1945.
 García Rúa, J. A. Sánchez Pérez. Gaceta matemática. 1ª serie, 11, págs. 3–5.

1882 births
1958 deaths
Historians of mathematics